Charles Francis Risk (August 19, 1897 – December 26, 1943) was a U.S. Representative from Rhode Island.

Born in Central Falls, Rhode Island, Risk attended the public and high schools there. He worked in local textile plants. During the First World War served in the United States Army as a private at Camp Meigs in 1918.

He was employed in the Treasury Department in Washington, D.C., from 1919 to 1922.

He graduated from the law department of Georgetown University in 1922, and was admitted to the bar in 1923, taking up a practice in his home town the same year.

He served as probate judge of Central Falls from 1929 to 1931, as coroner of Lincoln, Rhode Island in 1931 and 1932, and as federal judge on the Eleventh District Court of Rhode Island from 1932 to 1935.

He served as delegate to the Republican state conventions in 1936, 1940, and 1942.

Risk was elected to the Seventy-fourth Congress as a Republican, filling  fill the vacancy caused by the resignation of Francis B. Condon; he served from August 6, 1935, to January 3, 1937. He was an unsuccessful candidate for reelection in 1936.

Risk was elected to the Seventy-sixth Congress (January 3, 1939 – January 3, 1941), and made an unsuccessful reelection bid in 1940, after which he resumed the practice of law in Pawtucket, Rhode Island.

He died in Saylesville, in the township of Lincoln, Rhode Island, December 26, 1943, and was buried in St. Francis Cemetery in Pawtucket.

Sources

1897 births
1943 deaths
Georgetown University Law Center alumni
United States Army soldiers
Rhode Island state court judges
Republican Party members of the United States House of Representatives from Rhode Island
People from Central Falls, Rhode Island
20th-century American judges
20th-century American politicians